Nuntsi Provincial Park, also known as Taseko Provincial Park, is a provincial park in British Columbia, Canada, located on the west side of the Taseko River in that province's Chilcotin District, flanking both sides of Nuntsi Creek.

References

Geography of the Chilcotin
Provincial parks of British Columbia
1995 establishments in British Columbia
Protected areas established in 1995